Eduardo Pincelli (born 23 April 1983) is a Brazilian footballer who plays as a midfielder for Karmiotissa FC.

Career
On 3 January 2020, it was confirmed that Pincelli had joined Karmiotissa FC.

References

External links

1983 births
Living people
Brazilian footballers
Brazilian expatriate footballers
Fluminense FC players
Örebro SK players
Mirassol Futebol Clube players
Mogi Mirim Esporte Clube players
Atlético Bucaramanga footballers
Sabah F.C. (Malaysia) players
Nea Salamis Famagusta FC players
Alki Larnaca FC players
Duque de Caxias Futebol Clube players
Aris Limassol FC players
Ethnikos Achna FC players
Sligo Rovers F.C. players
Omonia Aradippou players
Karmiotissa FC players
Allsvenskan players
Cypriot First Division players
Cypriot Second Division players
League of Ireland players
Brazilian expatriate sportspeople in Sweden
Brazilian expatriate sportspeople in Colombia
Brazilian expatriate sportspeople in Malaysia
Brazilian expatriate sportspeople in Italy
Brazilian expatriate sportspeople in Cyprus
Expatriate footballers in Sweden
Expatriate footballers in Colombia
Expatriate footballers in Malaysia
Expatriate footballers in Italy
Expatriate footballers in Cyprus
Association football midfielders
Pol. Alghero players
Footballers from São Paulo

Brazilian people of Italian descent